Massimo Apollonio (born 31 March 1970 in Casorate Primo) is a former Italian racing cyclist.

Major results
1995
1st Stage 6 Giro della Valle d'Aosta
2nd Giro del Canavese
1999
1st Coppa Agostoni
2000
1st Criterium d'Abruzzo
2001
1st Stage 4 Vuelta a Burgos

Grand Tour general classification results timeline

References

1970 births
Living people
Italian male cyclists
Cyclists from the Province of Pavia